Yorinobu is a masculine Japanese given name.

Possible writings
Yorinobu can be written using many different combinations of kanji characters. Here are some examples: 

頼信, "rely, believe"
頼伸, "rely, extend"
頼延, "rely, extend"
頼宣, "rely, announce"
依信, "to depend on, believe"
依伸, "to depend on, extend"
依延, "to depend on, extend"
依宣, "to depend on, announce"

The name can also be written in hiragana よりのぶ or katakana ヨリノブ.

Notable people with the name
, Japanese samurai
, Japanese daimyō

Japanese masculine given names